A coiled tubing truck is used to deploy continuous tubing into an oil or gas well. They are normally used for well cleanouts (both over balanced or jetvac underbalanced, plug pulling or drill outs, fishing, spotting of acid or cement, installation of umbilicals such as flatak, or instrument and camera runs in vertical or horizontal oil and gas wells.

There are 4 types of coiled tubing trucks:
 Shallow coiled tubing trucks, sometimes called bobtail units or body load units. These units are used on wells that are less than 5,000 feet deep and usually are mounted on traditional single steering axle and tandem rear axle semi trucks. Some larger shallow units are mounted on tandem steering and tridem rear axle trucks. These units traditionally use 1" to 1.50" tubing and have 660 CFM air compressors mounted on the truck for self-contained air to keep the well service as economic as possible. An example of a service provider of this would be Titan Oil and Gas Services.
 Intermediate Units are used on wells from 5,000 feet to 10,000 feet deep and mounted on semi truck and trailer units. These units usually use 1.75" or 2" for intermediate well depths and if they are going deeper they will use 1.25".
 Large Coil units are used on wells 10,000 feet and deeper or used on intermediate well depths when the work calls high flows of nitrogen for large size tubing such as 2", 2 3/8" or 2 7/8".
 Portable Drilling Units. Drilling with coil tubing is a relatively new technology. The advantage of drilling with coil is the speed at which one can drill. There are no pipe connections to be made and as such the drilling can be accomplished very rapidly. The deepest coil drilling on land record currently is held by Nordic Calista at 17,515 feet deep.

Drilling technology